The following lists events that happened during 1958 in South Africa.

Incumbents
 Monarch: Queen Elizabeth II.
 Governor-General and High Commissioner for Southern Africa: Ernest George Jansen.
 Prime Minister: Johannes Gerhardus Strijdom (until 24 August), Hendrik Frensch Verwoerd (starting 2 September).
 Chief Justice: Henry Allan Fagan.

Events

April
 16 – The last general election of the Union of South Africa takes place.

May
 6 – Margaret Rheeder is hanged in Pretoria for poisoning her husband, Benjamin Fredenman.

September
 2 – Hendrik Verwoerd becomes the 6th Prime Minister of South Africa.

October
 13 – Penny Coelen is crowned as Miss World 1958 during the 8th Miss World pageant, the first South African to win the title.

December
 12–14 – The 46th Annual Conference of the African National Congress is held in Durban.

Births
 27 February – Naas Botha, rugby player
 14 April – Danie Gerber, rugby player
 14 April – Blade Nzimande, politician, national minister, General Secretary of the South African Communist Party
 21 April – Senzo Mchunu, politician, national minister
 21 April – Lindiwe Zulu, national minister
 30 April – Mbhazima Shilowa, trade unionist and politician.
 27 May – Cheryl Carolus, activist and politician.
 5 June – Jackson Mthembu, politician, national minister 
 17 June – Barbara Creecy; anti-apartheid movement activist, member of the African National Congress, national minister
 28 July – Deon van der Walt, tenor. (d. 2005)
 4 August – Steve Kekana, singer & songwriter
 7 August – Aaron Motsoaledi, politician, national minister
 24 October – Gcina Mhlophe, actress, storyteller, poet, playwright, director and author
 27 October – Jonathan Shapiro, cartoonist
 15 December – Don Laka, jazz musician, songwriter, producer. Most well known for being the co-founder of record label, Kalawa Jazmee Records.

Deaths
 2 May – Henry Cornelius, film director, producer, screenwriter and editor. (b. 1913)

Railways

Locomotives
Two new Cape gauge locomotive types enter service on the South African Railways.
 The first of fifty-five Class 5E, Series 3 electric locomotives.
 In June and July forty-five Class 1-DE General Electric type U12B locomotives are the first diesel-electrics to enter SAR service in quantity.

References

History of South Africa